Piecki may refer to the following places:
Piecki, Bydgoszcz County in Kuyavian-Pomeranian Voivodeship (north-central Poland)
Piecki, Podlaskie Voivodeship (north-east Poland)
Piecki, Pomeranian Voivodeship (north Poland)
Piecki, Warmian-Masurian Voivodeship (north Poland)